Brendan Jordan (born ) is a YouTuber and model.

In October 2014, Jordan "went viral" after dancing moves from Lady Gaga's music video for the song "Applause" in the background of a live broadcast on NewsChannel 8.

Biography 
On October 9, 2014, NewsChannel 8 filmed Jordan in the background of their live coverage of the opening of Downtown Summerlin. While being filmed, Jordan reproduced the dance moves from the "Applause" music video from Lady Gaga, released two months earlier.

The next day, Lady Gaga tweeted that she "liked him", while the drag community, including RuPaul and Pandora Boxx, actively shared the video. The video was also widely diffused by media outlets such as The Today Show and ABC News,

Other work
In October 2014, Jordan appeared on The Queen Latifah Show where he met Raven from RuPaul's Drag Race. In November 2014, he was a model for the American Apparel brand. He was chosen for how he used their platform to raise awareness towards the LGBT community.

References

External links 
 

1999 births
American bloggers
American male bloggers
American people of Peruvian descent
American YouTubers
LGBT Hispanic and Latino American people
LGBT people from Nevada
LGBT models
American LGBT rights activists
LGBT YouTubers
Transgender entertainers
Transgender male actors
Transgender models
American gay actors
Gay models
Living people
Male models from Nevada
20th-century LGBT people
21st-century LGBT people